Ivan John Anderson (born 13 August 1944) is a former Irish cricketer. He was a right-handed batsman and a right-arm off-break bowler.

He made his debut for the Ireland cricket team against Middlesex in July 1966, and went on to play for his country 86 times in all. Of these matches, 19 had first-class status and three had List A status. He had a highest first-class score of 147, and his best bowling in first-class cricket was 5/21. He had a higher score for Ireland in a non-first-class match, scoring 198 not out against Canada at the Toronto Cricket, Skating and Curling Club in September 1973, an innings that was the highest in all of Ireland's matches until Eoin Morgan broke it in February 2007. He had 86 matches, 141 innings, 25 not out's, 3,777 runs, his average was 32.56, he got thirteen 50's, seven 100's and 48 wickets. He played for Armagh, Queens University, Waringstown and Ireland (1966–1985)

Ivan Anderson was arguably the most complete Irish cricketer in history and certainly one of the few players of his time who were good enough to play county cricket. A forceful, stylish right-handed batsmen, swooping cover fielder and niggardly off-spin bowler, Anderson became a legend of the Ulster club scene during a wonderful forty-year career and also broke records at international level, some of which still stand to this day.

References 

1944 births
Irish cricketers
Living people
People from Armagh (city)
Cricketers from Northern Ireland